Matthew Robert Patrick (born November 15, 1986), known online as MatPat, is an American YouTuber and internet personality. He is the creator of The Game Theorists, The Film Theorists, The Food Theorists, and The Style Theorists YouTube channels, each analyzing various video games, films, food, and fashion respectively. In addition to the creation of his channels, Patrick narrates the majority of the videos that are presented on his channels. Patrick has also created the live gaming channel GTLive and hosted the YouTube Premium series MatPat's Game Lab. As of February 2023, Patrick has amassed over 36 million subscribers, as well as over 7 billion total views across all five of his channels.

Early life 
Matthew Robert Patrick was born on November 15, 1986, in Medina County, Ohio. He is the son of Robert P and Linda Kosarek. Growing up Patrick took an interest in video games such as the Mario franchise as well as Castlevania. During his early years is where he obtained his nickname MatPat. He also became heavily involved with the performing arts specifically musical theater. Patrick was involved in five show choirs, he was the president and dance captain as well as a violist in a hometown orchestra in which he would perform in approximately six stage shows per year. From an early age, Patrick enjoyed school and would take extra courses, which would transfer over to his university years.

After graduating valedictorian of his high school graduating class, Patrick attended Duke University on an academic scholarship and majored in psychology and theater as well as neuroscience. He was a resident assistant for three years and graduated in 2009 as summa cum laude and a member of Phi Beta Kappa.

Career

YouTube 
Patrick first created a YouTube account under the name "MatthewPatrick13" in 2009. He uploaded numerous videos of his performances and auditions for musical theater.

After graduation, Patrick moved to New York City to pursue an acting career, but after two years of near-total unemployment, he uploaded the promotional trailer for Game Theory, inspired by the YouTube series Extra Credits episode "Tangential Learning". He uploaded the first episode of Game Theory on April 18, 2011, with the goal of creating "gaming's tangential learning experience" to show his abilities to companies that might watch his channel. Example topics covered on Game Theory include Nintendo characters, Minecraft, Five Nights at Freddy's, Call of Duty, Pokémon, and Petscop, etc. He occasionally uploaded videos commenting on the gaming market and gamers, as well as on other matters that he deemed noteworthy. He gained subscribers and his videos were being posted on the front pages of sites such as ScrewAttack and GameTrailers.

In 2012, Patrick introduced two partner channels that included Gaijin Goombah as well as Ronnie Edwards.

The Game Theorists reached one million subscribers on December 17, 2013, and 10 million in July 2018. As of March 2022, The Game Theorists has 16.2 million subscribers and over 3.61 billion views.

On May 12, 2015, Patrick created a second channel called The Film Theorists where he debuted his second show, Film Theory. The first video was uploaded on June 2, 2015. Film Theory follows the same format as Game Theory, but focuses on tv shows, films, web videos and the film industry instead of gaming. The Film Theorists reached one million subscribers a month after the channel's debut. As of March 2022, The Film Theorists has 11.3 million subscribers and over 2 billion views.Patrick started a Let's Play series called GTLive on August 26, 2015, where he streams mostly gameplay and video reactions with his wife Stephanie. Starting on October 3, 2016, the Monday streams became part of YouTube Gaming Primetime and are therefore scheduled for 3 pm to 5 pm PST. It also includes a voting mechanism, which can be used by Patrick to conduct quick polls. As of March 2022, GTLive had 2.94 million subscribers and over 649 million views. As of 2022, the GTLive channel continues to upload mostly unedited, pre-recorded content.

On June 8, 2016, Patrick posted via his YouTube channel a new show, MatPat's Game Lab, on Google's paid subscription service, YouTube Premium. The show mainly focuses on placing video game players in real life scenarios mimicking scenarios that occur in video games, such as bomb defusing, parkour, survival and military training. Despite MatPat's interest in developing a second season, YouTube has yet to announce any further development into the project. He was also a part of the PewDiePie YouTube Premium series Scare PewDiePie (2016).

In 2019, The Game Theorists held a 9-hour charity livestream that generated $1.3 million for St. Jude Children's Research Hospital. The stream included guests Markiplier, TheOdd1sOut, Rosanna Pansino, Scott Cawthon, and others. Multiple other charity streams were held for St. Jude in the following years.

The third Theory channel, and fourth overall; The Food Theorists, began releasing videos in July 2020. The Food Theorists, using the same style as its predecessors, blends food science with psychology, physiology, and conspiracy. The channel was being developed for two years prior to its launch. As of October 2022, The Food Theorists had 4 million subscribers and over 499 million views. It had reached 1 million subscribers exactly a week after launch, and had then gained another million over the succeeding 4 months.

On the 20th of December 2022 a fourth Theory channel, and 5th overall, was announced on the Game Theory Channel, along with the channel's purchase by Lunar X. On February 18, 2023, The Style Theorists was released. The Style Theorists, like the other channels, focuses at the science, math, history, psychology, and mystery of fashion. It reached 1 million subscribers three days later.

Other media and collaborations 
Patrick was involved in the web series TOME: Terrain of Magical Expertise. He gained the series more attention and exposure by uploading a re-mastered version of the first episode on the channel on October 1, 2013, and then providing a platform for the series. The game was released on Steam on September 9, 2021.

A character based on Patrick was included in The Walking Dead: Road to Survival (2015). In 2017, Patrick and his wife Stephanie participated in Nintendo's Pokkén Tournament DX Invitational, an event held during E3 2017. He was paired with Allister Singh, the only pro-Pokkén Tournament player in the event. His team eventually won the tournament. Patrick voiced Computron in the animated series Transformers: Titans Return (2017).

In 2019, Patrick partnered with Nickelodeon to make the show Fact or Nicktion. In this show, Patrick examined various phenomena in Nickelodeon shows, such as SpongeBob SquarePants, Avatar: The Last Airbender and Rugrats to determine whether they could or couldn't happen in real life.

Personal life 
Patrick is married to Stephanie Patrick (born Cordato), whom he met while studying at Duke University. The two became close after creating a Legend of Zelda parody called The Epic of Stew. They were married on May 19, 2012. Their son Oliver was born in 2018, and the family currently divides their time between living in California and North Carolina.

Awards and nominations

See also 
 List of YouTubers

References

External links 
 
 

1986 births
Living people
American male video game actors
American YouTubers
Duke University alumni
Gaming YouTubers
Food and cooking YouTubers
People from Medina, Ohio
People from North Carolina
Streamy Award winners
Video game commentators
Video game critics
Web series producers
YouTube streamers